Winalot is a popular brand of dog food sold in the United Kingdom and Ireland.

The name was first used in 1927 for dog biscuits by Spillers Ltd; they were initially marketed as a food for racing greyhounds, but soon gained popularity with domestic canines and became a brand leader in the 1930s.

The Spillers business was acquired in 1998 by Nestlé, after which point the Winalot brand was expanded to include a wide range of dry and tinned dog foods and snacks.

Winalot is now marketed by Nestlé Purina PetCare, and is the UK's second biggest-selling dog food brand. Their products have recently been subject to a packaging change, to modernize and refresh the brand in 2016.

References

External links 

 

Dog food brands
Nestlé brands